"Party Out of Bounds" is the title of a 1980 song by The B-52's, from their album Wild Planet. Featured with the other dancefloor-bound tracks from the album, the song peaked at number 5 on the Billboard Hot Dance Club Play chart in 1980 as an album cut and has long been a staple of alternative/new wave dance club playlists. Lyrically, the song is a guide on how to better plan house parties in order to prevent potential disasters. An instrumental dub mix was included on the B-side of the vinyl 45 rpm single "Private Idaho". 

The following year, another mix of "Party Out of Bounds" appeared on the B-52's' Party Mix! EP, remixed by Daniel Coulombe and Steven Stanley to feature elements of the dub mix, embellished with echoes and additional keyboard effects. Two years later, Stanley produced and engineered the B-52's' 1983 album Whammy!.

Song
The song begins with the B-52's crashing a party, with the opening beat punctuated by a discordant guitar riff implying unexpected arrival, Fred Schneider screaming "Sur-PRI-ise!" and Kate Pierson belting out "PAR-TAY!". It quickly becomes evident that this party is poorly-planned and executed. The balance of the lyrics describe what can go wrong at a party, how to remedy these bad situations, and prevent them from happening in the first place with proper planning.

The title "Party Out of Bounds" was also used as the title of the 1991 book Party Out of Bounds: The B-52's, R.E.M. and the Kids Who Rocked Athens, Ga. by Rodger Lyle Brown. That book remains the only chronicle of the early Athens music scene written by someone who lived in Athens throughout the period of 1976 through 1987.

Radio show
Party Out of Bounds, a music show on Sirius Satellite Radio hosted by Schneider, was named after the song. It aired Friday nights, 9pm to 12am (ET) on First Wave. On the radio show, Schneider played a mix of new wave-era dance, remixes and rarities, interspersed with his own humorous bits and anecdotes. The show's last broadcast was on August 22, 2008, as Schneider left the station to pursue other projects.

References

The B-52's songs
1980 singles
Songs written by Fred Schneider
Songs written by Kate Pierson
Songs written by Keith Strickland
Songs written by Cindy Wilson
Warner Records singles
1980 songs